is a mountain with an altitude of 3,084m located in the southern part of the Hida Mountains, which straddles Matsumoto in Nagano Prefecture and Takayama in Gifu Prefecture. This mountain is located in Chūbu-Sangaku National Park.

References

Hida Mountains
Mount Naka
Mountains of Gifu Prefecture
Mountains of Nagano Prefecture
Mount Naka
Matsumoto, Nagano
Takayama, Gifu